Daniel Supasirirat, known as Danny Supa (born October 13, 1978) is a goofy-footed American professional skateboarder.

Skateboarding career 
In the 1998, Transworld Skateboarding video Feedback, Supa wore an all white track suit. In 2002, Nike SB released a New York Knicks colorway SB Dunk by Supa. In 2017, Nike released a hightop dunk of Supa's original Knicks color way.

Skate Video parts 

 1995: A Love Supreme - Supreme
 1997: Issue 23 - 411VM
 1998: Mix Tape - Zoo York
 1999: Peep This - Zoo York
 2002: Unbreakable Mix Tape 2 - Zoo York
 2002: E.S.T 3.0 - Zoo York
 2003: City of Killers - Zoo York
 2003: Issue 59 - 411VM
 2004: On Tap - Nike SB
 2004: Seek & Destroy - Red Bull
 2004: Vinny Raffa Has A Posse
 2005: R.B. Umali NY Revisited Vol 1 (96-97)
 2005: Vicious Cycle - R.B. Umali
 2006: Streets: NYC
 2007: A Journey Through Sound - Stereo
 2007: Nothing But The Truth - Nike SB
 2008: The Coast
 2008: Agency Field Report - Stereo
 2009: Full Frequency -  Hi Fi
 2010: Don't Fear The Sweeper - Nike SB
 2011: Stay in Front - BLVD
 2014: The Brodies
 2016: Quinto - BLVD

Personal life 
Supa was born in Thailand and has family that lives there.

References 

American skateboarders
Living people
1978 births
American sportspeople of Thai descent